In computability theory a cylindrification is a construction that associates a cylindric numbering to each numbering. The concept was first introduced by Yuri L. Ershov in 1973.

Definition 

Given a numbering , the cylindrification  is defined as

where  is the Cantor pairing function.

Note that the cylindrification operation increases the input arity by 1.

Properties 
 Given two numberings  and  then

References 
 Yu. L. Ershov, "Theorie der Numerierungen I." Zeitschrift für mathematische Logik und Grundlagen der Mathematik 19, 289-388 (1973).

Theory of computation